The term "Expressionist Rococo" was first used in 1928 by Max Osborn to describe the Theater am Kurfürstendamm in Berlin designed by Oskar Kaufmann. In difference to the original Rococo design Kaufmann emphasizes on the dynamic and movement as a whole concept. Asymmetrical details are subordinated to a large symmetrical frame.  Other protagonists of this style were Hans Poelzig,  Leo Nachtlicht and Gerhard Schliepstein.

Further reading 
 Bie, Oscar (1928). Der Architekt Oskar Kaufmann. Berlin: Ernst Pollak Verlag
 Berents, Catharina (1998). Art Déco in Deutschland - Das moderne ornament. Frankfurt a.M.: Anabas Verlag
 Hansen, Antje (2001). Oskar Kaufmann - Ein Theaterarchitekt zwischen Tradition und Moderne. Berlin: Gebr. Mann Verlag

References

Architectural styles